Tom Chan is a Canadian businessman and philanthropist. He is known for donating $10 million in support of the University of British Columbia's Chan Centre for the Performing Arts, along with his brother, Caleb Chan.

Awards and recognitions 
Chan has been conferred two honorary degrees: Doctor of Laws from the Southwestern Adventist University and Doctor of Letters from the University of British Columbia.

References

Businesspeople from Vancouver
Canadian chief executives
Canadian philanthropists
Canadian real estate businesspeople
Hong Kong emigrants to Canada
Hong Kong philanthropists
Hong Kong real estate businesspeople
Naturalized citizens of Canada
Year of birth missing (living people)
Living people